Allocasuarina distyla, commonly known as scrub she-oak, is a shrub or small tree of the She-oak family Casuarinaceae endemic to New South Wales.

Description
This plant is extremely resilient as it has the ability to grow in poor conditions such as draught. The ridges are angular to rounded and occasionally pubescent. There are 6–8 teeth.
The samara is a very dark brown. This plant is dioecious, meaning that the male and female reproductive organs develop on different trees. The most common time this plant will flower is between the months of July through September, however, this may vary depending on rainfall. In Greek, 'allos' translates to 'other' and 'Casuarina' implies a comparison to 'foliage'. 'Di' translates to 'two' whereas 'stylos' translates to 'column'. These translations relate to the characteristics of this plant.

Taxonomy
The species was first described as Casuarina distyla by the botanist Étienne Pierre Ventenat in 1802 in the Description des Plantes Nouvelles et peu connues, cultivees dans le Jardin de J.M. Cels. It was subsequently reclassified into the Allocasuarina genus by Lawrence Alexander Sidney Johnson in 1982 in a revision of the sheoaks, Notes on Casuarinaceae II., published in the Journal of the Adelaide Botanic Gardens.

Image gallery

References

Fagales of Australia
distyla
Flora of New South Wales
Plants described in 1802
Dioecious plants